Scopula cesa is a moth of the family Geometridae. It is found in Korea.

Taxonomy
The name Scopula convergens is a junior secondary homonym of Emmiltis convergens (Warren, 1904) and thus required a replacement name.

References

Moths described in 2004
cesa
Endemic fauna of Korea
Moths of Korea